Goodshaw is a hamlet on the edge of the Pennine hills in England just north of the market town of Rawtenstall, Lancashire, and just south of Loveclough. It is also a ward of Rossendale, where the population taken at the 2011 census was 4,033.

See also

Listed buildings in Rawtenstall

References

External links
 Brief history

Hamlets in Lancashire
Geography of the Borough of Rossendale